Wadi Bani Auf is a wādī (gorge) in Ad Dakhiliyah Region of Oman. People with the name Al-ʿAufī are associated with this place.

See also 
 Al Hajar Mountains
 Al-Rustaq
 List of wadis of Oman
 Snake Gorge (within Wadi Bani Awf)
 Wadi Bani Khalid

References

External links 
 Wadi Bani Awf Oman
 Wadi Bani Awf - Oman

 
Ad Dakhiliyah Governorate